Lone Chaw is a retired Burmese Lethwei fighter and former Openweight Lethwei World Champion.

Personal life
Lone Chaw is of Karen descent. He was born in a humble village in the Ayeyarwady division in Myanmar. He dropped out of school in the ninth grade and started working at the family farm full-time. In 1995, he started training Lethwei and became determined to be a successful professional fighter when he learned his hometown did not boast a Myanmar Lethwei champion. He moved to Yangon in 1999 to pursue that goal. His first fight was at a traditional festival.

In 2004, he joined Thut Ti Lethwei Gym under Win Zin Oo. In 2012, at 36 years old, Lone Chaw retired from fighting and started coaching.

Lethwei career
Lone Chaw made a name for himself by fighting local and international competition. Notably, he was one of the first Lethwei fighter to go fight in Japan.

In 1999, Lone Chaw won the Myanmar Interstate Division Title and the Golden Belt Championship in 2006 and 2007. His most notorious fight was against the legendary Shwe War Tun in 2004, whom he had admired before he became a professional fighter. In an interview, Lone Chaw said "Shwe War Tun is an idol for me because of his fighting capability. I really respect him." Shwe Sai was stripped of the Openweight Lethwei World title for failure to defend the title. Former Openweight champion Shwe War Tun was selected to faced Lone Chaw who was number one contender in order to crown a new champion. Lone Chaw was victorious and became the new Openweight Champion.

On April 26, 2008, the fight against Win Tun ended in a bloody draw. The result was a big blow to Lone Chaw's reputation, as the 63 kg challenger Win Tun controlled most of the fight.

On July 27, 2008, Lone Chaw who was coming from 10 consecutive draws, defeated Lethwei rising star Wunna by TKO in Yangon. Wunna was dropped by a fury of punches and wasn't able to answer the count.

On March 1, 2009, Lone Chaw lost the Lethwei Openweight World title to Saw Nga Man in Yangon, Myanmar.

On 4 May, 2009, as reported by MMA Mania, Lone Chaw faced Shwe Sai in Yangon and lost by knocked out.

Championships and accomplishments

Championships 
Lethwei World Champion
 Openweight Lethwei Golden Belt
 Other titles
 2006 Golden Belt Champion 
 2007 Golden Belt Champion
 2008 Intl. Challenge Fight victor
 1999 Myanmar Interstate Tournament Champion

Lethwei record 

|- style="background:#c5d2ea;"
|- style="background:#c5d2ea;"
| 2014-08-17 || Draw || align="left" | Shwe War Tun || National Championship Challenge event || Yangon, Myanmar || Draw || 3 || 3:00
|- style="background:#c5d2ea;"
| 2013-01-04 || Draw || align="left" | Yan Gyi Aung || Mandalay Rumbling Challenge || Taungoo, Myanmar || Draw || 5 || 3:00
|- style="background:#c5d2ea;"
| 2012-09-15 || Draw || align="left" | Rua Druce || Mandalay Rumbling International Challenge || Yangon, Myanmar || Draw || 5 || 3:00
|- style="background:#c5d2ea;"
| 2012-03-27 || Draw || align="left" | Kyal Lin Aung || Lethwei Challenge Fights & Fundraiser || Pyay Township, Myanmar || Draw || 5 || 3:00
|- style="background:#c5d2ea;"
| 2011-11-05 || Draw || align="left" | Tun Tun || Myanmar vs. Australia Challenge Fights || Yangon, Myanmar || Draw || 5 || 3:00
|-  style="background:#fbb;"
| 2011-05-17 || Loss ||align=left| Phoe Kay || Challenge Fights || Mudon Township, Myanmar || KO || 4 || 
|-  style="background:#fbb;"
| 2010-12-26 || Loss ||align=left| Phoe Kay || Dagon Shwe Aung Lan Championship Semi-final || Yangon, Myanmar || KO || 4 || 0:32
|-  style="background:#fbb;"
| 2010-08-02 || Loss ||align=left| Phoe Kay || Myingyan Challenge Fights || Mandalay, Myanmar || KO ||  || 
|-  style="background:#fbb;"
| 2009-12-14 || Loss ||align=left| Shwe Sai || Dagon Shwe Aung Lan Championship Semi-final || Yangon, Myanmar || Decision || 5 || 3:00
|- style="background:#c5d2ea;"
| 2009-10-25 || Draw || align="left" | Fahsura PSR Muay Thai Gym || Myanmar vs. Thailand Challenge Fights || Yangon, Myanmar || Draw || 5 || 3:00
|-  style="background:#fbb;"
| 2009-09-20 || Loss ||align=left| Saw Nga Man || 2009 Golden Belt Championship Final || Yangon, Myanmar || Decision || 5 || 3:00
|- style="background:#c5d2ea;"
| 2009-05-03 || Draw || align="left" | Naoki Samukawa || Myanmar vs. Japan Goodwill Letwhay Competition || Yangon, Myanmar || Draw || 5 || 3:00
|- style="background:#cfc;"
| 2009-04-05 || Win || align="left" | Shwe Sai || Dagon Shwe Aung Lan Championship Final || Yangon, Myanmar || KO || 5 || 0:18
|-  style="background:#fbb;"
| 2009-03-01 || Loss ||align=left| Saw Nga Man || Dagon Shwe Aung Lan Championship Semi-final || Yangon, Myanmar || Decision || 5 || 3:00
|-
! style=background:white colspan=9 |
|- style="background:#c5d2ea;"
| 2008-11-30 || Draw || align="left" | Win Tun || Lethwei Challenge Fights || Yangon, Myanmar || Draw || 5 || 3:00
|- style="background:#cfc;"
| 2008-11-09 || Win || align="left" | Tunthong || Myanmar-Thai International Letwhay Challenge Fight || Yangon, Myanmar || KO || 3 || 2:44
|- style="background:#c5d2ea;"
| 2008-09-28 || Draw || align="left" | Saw Nga Man || Calsome Challenge Fight-1 || Yangon, Myanmar || Draw || 5 || 3:00
|- style="background:#cfc;"
| 2008-08-10 || Win || align="left" | Yan Gyi Aung || Lethwei Challenge Fights || Yangon, Myanmar || KO || 5 || 2:36
|- style="background:#cfc;"
| 2008-07-27 || Win || align="left" | Wunna || Thuwunna Indoor Stadium || Yangon, Myanmar || KO || 2 || 1:44
|- style="background:#c5d2ea;"
| 2008-04-26 || Draw || align="left" | Win Tun || Kandawgyi Park || Yangon, Myanmar || Draw || 5 || 3:00
|- style="background:#c5d2ea;"
| 2008-03-09 || Draw || align="left" | Shwe Sai || National Championship Challenge event (Shwe Sai) || Yangon, Myanmar || Draw || 5 || 3:00
|- style="background:#c5d2ea;"
| 2008-02-22 || Draw || align="left" | Shan Lay Thway || Kandawgyi Park || Yangon, Myanmar || Draw || 5 || 3:00
|- style="background:#c5d2ea;"
| 2008-02-12 || Draw || align="left" | Yan Gyi Aung || Challenge Fights || Mandalay, Myanmar || Draw || 5 || 3:00
|- style="background:#c5d2ea;"
| 2008-02-02 || Draw || align="left" | Thuya Ye Aung || Challenge Fights || Mawlamyine, Myanmar || Draw || 5 || 3:00
|- style="background:#c5d2ea;"
| 2008-01-27 || Draw || align="left" | Saw Nga Man || Sittwe Challenge Fights || Sittwe, Myanmar || Draw || 5 || 3:00
|- style="background:#c5d2ea;"
| 2007-12-23 || Draw || align="left" | Kyal Lin Aung || Lethwei Challenge Fights || Yangon, Myanmar || Draw || 5 || 3:00
|- style="background:#c5d2ea;"
| 2007-11-23 || Draw || align="left" | Yan Gyi Aung || Kandawgyi Park || Yangon, Myanmar || Draw || 5 || 3:00
|- style="background:#c5d2ea;"
| 2007-10-23 || Draw || align="left" | Shan Lay Thway || Kandawgyi Park || Yangon, Myanmar || Draw || 5 || 3:00
|- style="background:#cfc;"
| 2007-09-09 || Win || align="left" | Zan Htoo || Golden Belt Championship || Yangon, Myanmar || Decision || 5 || 3:00
|- style="background:#cfc;"
| 2007-08-19 || Win || align="left" | Nick Fiordo || Myanmar vs. Japan Challenge Fights || Differ Ariake Tokyo, Japan || KO || 3 || 1:34
|- style="background:#c5d2ea;"
| 2007-05-12 || Draw || align="left" | Zan Htoo || Kandawgyi Park || Yangon, Myanmar || Draw || 5 || 3:00
|- style="background:#cfc;"
| 2007-04-07 || Win || align="left" | Saw Nga Man || Kandawgyi Park Challenge Fights || Yangon, Myanmar || KO || 2 || 2:30
|- style="background:#c5d2ea;"
| 2007-02 || Draw || align="left" | Saw Nga Man || Lethwei Challenge Fights || Tachileik, Myanmar || Draw || 5 || 3:00
|- style="background:#cfc;"
| 2007-01-07 || Win || align="left" | Shwe War Tun || Kandawgyi Park || Yangon, Myanmar || KO || 2 || 1:55
|- style="background:#cfc;"
| 2006-05-21 || Win ||align=left| Shwe War Tun || Golden Belt Championship || Yangon, Myanmar || Decision  || 5 || 3:00
|-
! style=background:white colspan=9 |
|- style="background:#cfc;"
| 2006-03-17 || Win || align="left" | Tetsuya Yamauchi || Kushima's Fight 12 || Shinjuku FACE Tokyo, Japan || KO || 3 || 2:10
|- style="background:#cfc;"
| 2006-01-26 || Win || align="left" | Wan Chai || Myeik city Lethwei Challenge Fights || Myeik, Myanmar || Draw || 3 || 
|- style="background:#c5d2ea;"
| 2005-10-16 || Draw || align="left" | Shwe Sai || 2nd City F.M Aung Lan Tournament, Myanmar Convention Center || Yangon, Myanmar || Draw || 5 || 3:00
|- style="background:#cfc;"
| 2005-09-11 || Win || align="left" | Wataru Imamura || Kushima's Fight 10 || Nagasaki Peace Kaikan Hall Nagasaki, Japan || KO || 1 || 1:25
|- style="background:#c5d2ea;"
| 2005-08-07 || Draw || align="left" | Saw Nga Man || 23rd Southeast Asian Games placements and Challenge Fights || Yangon, Myanmar || Draw || 5 || 3:00
|- style="background:#c5d2ea;"
| 2005-04-03 || Draw || align="left" | Wan Chai || City F.M Aung Lan Tournament, Myanmar Convention Center || Yangon, Myanmar || Draw || 5 || 3:00
|-  style="background:#fbb;"
| 2004-06-05 || Loss ||align=left| Wan Chai || Myeik city Lethwei Challenge Fights || Myeik, Myanmar || KO || 3 || 2:50
|- style="background:#cfc;"
| 2004-02-29 || Win || align="left" | Ali (Thaton) || First class Challenge Fights at Thuwunna Gymnasium || Yangon, Myanmar || KO || ||
|- style="background:#c5d2ea;"
| 2003-05-18 || Draw || align="left" | Thuya Ye Aung || Challenge Fights, Meiktila District Sports Hall || Meiktila, Myanmar || Draw || 5 || 3:00
|-
| colspan=9 | Legend:

References

External links
 

Living people
1976 births
Burmese people of Karen descent
Burmese Lethwei practitioners
People from Ayeyarwady Region